A list of notable Polish politicians of the historical Communist Party of Poland.

B
 Jakub Berman
 Bolesław Bierut
 Jerzy Borejsza

C
 Jerzy Czeszejko-Sochacki

D
 Gershon Dua-Bogen
 Tomasz Dąbal

F
 Paweł Finder

G
 Władysław Gomułka

K
 Zenon Kliszko
 Maria Koszutska
 Władysław Kowalski

L
 Witold Leder
 Julian Leszczyński

M
 Stanisław Mazur
 Hilary Minc
 Mieczysław Moczar
 Zygmunt Modzelewski
 Bolesław Mołojec

N
 Zenon Nowak
 Marceli Nowotko

O
 Edward Ochab

P
 Leon Pasternak

R
 Stanisław Radkiewicz
 Roman Romkowski
 Józef Różański

S
 Włodzimierz Sokorski
 Marian Spychalski
 Stefan Staszewski
 Lucjan Szenwald

W
 Adolf Warski

Z
 Roman Zambrowski
 Aleksander Zawadzki

References